The Hidișel is a left tributary of the river Peța in Romania. It flows into the Peța in Sânmartin, south of Oradea.

References

Rivers of Romania
Rivers of Bihor County